Olivella, common name the dwarf olives, is a genus of small predatory sea snails, marine gastropod molluscs in the subfamily Olivellinae of the family Olividae, the olives. Olivella is the type genus of the family.

Description
Adults in the Olivella species are usually quite small, hence the genus has the common name "dwarf olive". Species of Oliva are usually larger, but there are exceptions.

The shell of Olivella usually has a keel-like twist at the anterior end of the columella. The wall above it may be concave or have deep furrows. The inner lip can sometimes show a deep callus, and in many cases this extends over the parietal wall to the end of the aperture. This callus formation may extend to the spire but leave the suture open. Most species of Olivella have a thin, chitinous operculum, but this operculum is lacking in Olivella nivea, as is also the case in species of Oliva.

Species 
Species in the genus Olivella include:

 Olivella acteocina Olsson, 1956
 Olivella alba (Marrat In Sowerby, 1871)
 Olivella albina Paulmier, 2015
 Olivella altatae Burch & Campbell, 1963
 Olivella amblia Watson, 1882
 Olivella anazora (Duclos, 1835)
 Olivella ankeli Diaz & Gotting, 1990
 Olivella arionata Absalão, 2000
 Olivella aureobalteata Kuroda & Habe, 1971
 Olivella aureocincta Carpenter, 1857
 Olivella barbenthos Recourt, 1989
 Olivella biminiensis Petuch, 2002
 Olivella bitleri Olsson, 1956
 Olivella borealis Golikov, 1967
 Olivella broggi Olsson, 1956
 Olivella bullula (Reeve, 1850) - bubble dwarf olive
 Olivella careorugula Absalão & Pimenta, 2003
 † Olivella clanzigi Lozouet 1992 
 Olivella cocosensis Olsson, 1956
 Olivella coensis Mansfield, 1930
 Olivella columellaris (G.B. Sowerby I, 1825)
 Olivella compta (Marrat, 1871)
 Olivella costulata Paulmier, 2007
 Olivella cymatilis S. S. Berry, 1963
 Olivella dama (Wood, 1828)
 Olivella decorata Paulmier, 2015
 Olivella defiorei Klappenbach, 1964
 Olivella diodocus (Marrat, 1871)
 Olivella dolichomorpha Paulmier, 2007
 Olivella drangai Olsson, 1956
 Olivella ephamilla Watson, 1882
 Olivella esther (Duclos, 1835)
 Olivella exilis (Marrat, 1871)
 Olivella fimbriata 
 Olivella fletcherae S. S. Berry, 1958
 Olivella floralia (Duclos, 1853) - rice olive
 Olivella formicacorsii Klappenbach, 1962
 Olivella fortunei (Marrat, 1871)
 Olivella fulgurata A. Adams & Reeve, 1850
 Olivella fundarugata Weisbord, 1962
 Olivella fuscocincta Dall, 1889
 Olivella gaylordi Ford, 1894
 Olivella gracilis (Broderip & Sowerby, 1828)
 Olivella guayaquilensis Bartsch, 1928
 Olivella guildingii (Reeve, 1850)
 Olivella hyalina Raven & Recourt, 2018
 Olivella hyphala Absalão & Pimenta, 2003
 Olivella inconspicua (C.B. Adams, 1852)
 Olivella intermedia Paulmier, 2015
 Olivella intorta Carpenter, 1857 
 Olivella inusta G. B. Sowerby III, 1915
 Olivella japonica Pilsbry, 1910
 Olivella kifos Macsotai & Campos, 2001
 Olivella klappenbachi Absalão & Pimenta, 2003
 Olivella lactea (Marrat, 1871)
 Olivella lanceolata (Reeve, 1850)
 Olivella lepta (Duclos, 1835)
 Olivella lindae Petuch, 1992: nomen nudum
 Olivella lineolata 
 Olivella macgintyi Olsson, 1956
 Olivella mandarina (Duclos, 1835)
 Olivella marginelloides Paulmier, 2007
 Olivella marmosa Olsson & McGinty, 1958
 Olivella mayabe Espinosa & Ortega, 1998
 Olivella mica (Duclos, 1835): nomen dubium
 † Olivella microstriata Raven & Recourt, 2018 
 Olivella micula (Marrat, 1871)
 Olivella miliacea (Marrat, 1871)
 Olivella miliola (d'Orbigny, 1842)
 Olivella millepunctata (Duclos, 1835)
 Olivella minuscula Paulmier, 2015
 Olivella minuta (Link, 1807) - minute dwarf olive
 Olivella miriadina (Duclos, 1835)
 Olivella moorei Abbott, 1951
 Olivella morrisoni Olsson, 1956
 Olivella mutica (Say, 1822) - variable dwarf olive
 Olivella myrmecoon Dall, 1912
 Olivella nana (Lamarck, 1811)
 Olivella nivea (Gmelin, 1791) - snowy dwarf olive
 Olivella nota (Marrat, 1871) 
 Olivella olssoni Altena, 1971
 Olivella orejasmirandai Klappenbach, 1986
 Olivella oteroi Bermejo, 1979
 Olivella parva T. S. Oldroyd, 1921 
 Olivella pedroana (Conrad, 1856)
 Olivella perplexa Olsson, 1956
 Olivella peterseni Olsson, 1956
 Olivella plana (Marrat, 1871)
 Olivella poppei Bozzetti, 1998
 † Olivella prefloralia Olsson & Harbison, 1953
 Olivella puelcha (Duclos, 1835)
 Olivella pulchella (Duclos, 1835)
 Olivella pulchra (Marrat, 1871)
 Olivella pulicaria (Marrat, 1871)
 Olivella pura (Reeve, 1850)
 Olivella pusilla (Marrat, 1871) - tiny dwarf olive
 Olivella rehderi Olsson, 1956
 Olivella riosi Klappenbach, 1991
 Olivella riverae Olsson, 1956
 Olivella rosolina (Duclos, 1835)
 Olivella rotunda Dall, 1889
 Olivella rubra (Marrat, 1871) (uncertain)
 Olivella rufifasciatus 
 Olivella santacruzence Castellanos, 1965 & Fernández, 1965
 Olivella scurra (Marrat, 1871)
 Olivella semistriata (Gray, 1839)
 Olivella signata (Lischke, 1869)
 Olivella sphoni Burch & Campbell, 1963
 Olivella spreta Gould, 1861
 Olivella spretoides Yokoyama, 1922
 Olivella stegeri Olsson, 1956
 Olivella steveni Burch & Campbell, 1963
 Olivella tabulata Dall, 1889 
 Olivella tehuelcha (Duclos, 1835)
 Olivella tergina (Duclos, 1835)
 Olivella thompsoni Olsson, 1956
 Olivella tunquina (Duclos, 1835)
 Olivella versicolor (Marrat, 1871)
 Olivella vitilia Watson, 1882
 Olivella volutella (Lamarck, 1811)
 Olivella volutelloides (Marrat, 1871)
 Olivella walkeri S. S. Berry, 1958
 Olivella watermani McGinty, 1940
 Olivella zanoeta (Duclos, 1835)
 Olivella zenopira (Duclos, 1835)
 Olivella zonalis (Lamarck, 1811)

Species brought into synonymy 
 Olivella adelae Olsson, 1956: synonym of Olivella lactea (Marrat, 1871)
 Olivella alectona (Duclos, 1835) - San Pedro dwarf olive: synonym of Callianax alectona (Duclos, 1835)
 Olivella amoni Sterba & Lorenz, 2005: synonym of Janoliva amoni (Sterba & Lorenz, 2005)
 Olivella apicalis Kay, 1979: synonym of Ancillina apicalis (Kay, 1979)
 Olivella australis Tenison-Woods, 1878: synonym of Parviterebra brazieri (Angas, 1875)
 Olivella baetica Carpenter, 1864 - beatic dwarf olive: synonym of Callianax alectona (Duclos, 1835)
 Olivella biplicata (G. B. Sowerby I, 1825) - purple dwarf olive: synonym of Callianax biplicata (G. B. Sowerby I, 1825)
 Olivella columba (Duclos, 1835): synonym of Olivella esther (Duclos, 1835)
 Olivella dealbata (Reeve, 1850) - whitened dwarf olive: synonym of Olivella mica (Duclos, 1835)
 Olivella microspira Paulmier, 2007: synonym of Olivella miliola (d'Orbigny, 1842)
 Olivella millepunctata Duclos, 1840: synonym of Olivancillaria millepunctata (Duclos, 1840)
 Olivella monilifera (Reeve, 1850): synonym of Olivella mica (Duclos, 1835)
 Olivella paxillus Reeve, 1850: synonym of Oliva nitidula Duclos, 1835
 Olivella petiolita (Duclos, 1835): synonym of Olivella minuta (Link, 1807)
 Olivella plata (Ihering, 1909): synonym of Olivella puelcha (Duclos, 1835)
 Olivella purpurata Swainson, 1831: synonym of Olivella dama (W. Wood, 1828)
 Olivella simplex Pease, 1868: synonym of Olivellopsis simplex (Pease, 1868)
 Olivella striga]] (Reeve, 1850): synonym of Callianax strigata (Reeve, 1850)
 Olivella verriauxii (Duclos, 1857): synonym of Olivella minuta (Link, 1807)

References

External links 
  Axel A. Olsson, Studies on the genus Olivella; Proc.  Acad. Nat. Sci. Phila.; vol. CVIII 1956
  Swainson W. (1829-1833). Zoological Illustrations, or original figures and descriptions of new, rare, or interesting animals, selected chiefly from the classes of ornithology, entomology, and conchology, and arranged according to their apparent affinities. Second series. London: Baldwin & Cradock
 Orbigny A.D. d'. (1834-1847). Voyage dans l'Amérique méridionale, exécuté pendant les années 1826, 1827, 1828, 1829, 1830, 1831, 1832 et 1833. Tome 5(3) Mollusques. pp. i-xliii, 1-758, 85 plates

 
Olivellinae